Church of the Assumption or Church of Our Lady of Assumption is a Manueline church in the largely Portuguese-built city of Mazagan, currently El Jadida in Morocco. It was built in the early 16th century by the Portuguese.

See also 
 Portuguese Cistern (Mazagan)
 Portuguese Empire

References 

Former Portuguese colonies
World Heritage Sites in Morocco
El Jadida Province
Tourist attractions in Morocco